Saipal (Nepali: सइपाल ) is a Gaupalika(Nepali: गाउपालिका ; gaupalika) in Bajhang District in the Sudurpashchim Province of far-western Nepal. 
Saipal has a population of 2182.The land area is 1467.27 km2.

References

Rural municipalities in Bajhang District
Rural municipalities of Nepal established in 2017